Ludgate Circus was a planned London Underground station that would have formed part of "phase 2" of the Fleet line (now called the Jubilee line) had it been completed. Taking its name from the nearby Ludgate Circus in the City of London financial district, preliminary preparation work was begun in the 1970s, but the plan was later postponed due to lack of funds.

A National Rail station was eventually constructed near the Ludgate Circus site, but to serve the north–south Thameslink route, using the Snow Hill tunnel, rather than the originally envisaged east–west line. It used the previously redundant line that used to form the National Rail line terminating at Holborn Viaduct station. It was, however, built in such a way as to allow for an underground east–west aligned station to be easily integrated; this can be seen in the wide spaces at the Holborn end of the station, where large doors open on to a corridor intended to lead to escalators to an underground concourse level. It is still known today as the "LUL corridor" by staff.

Future plans
As of 2015, there are no plans or suggestions to build an Underground station at Ludgate Circus. However, there are long-term proposals to build an extension of the Docklands Light Railway (DLR) from Bank to Charing Cross, with stations planned at Ludgate Circus and Aldwych.

References

Unbuilt London Underground stations
Tube stations in the City of London
Proposed London Underground stations
Railway stations located underground in the United Kingdom